Justine Henin-Hardenne defeated compatriot and rival Kim Clijsters in the final, 6–3, 4–6, 6–3 to win the women's singles tennis title at the 2004 Australian Open. It was her third major title, each time defeating Clijsters in the final (after her victory at the 2003 French and US Opens). Clijsters would eventually win the title seven years later.

Serena Williams was the reigning champion, but did not participate this year due to a left knee injury.

Fabiola Zuluaga became the first Colombian to reach a major semifinal.

Seeds

Qualifying

Draw

Finals

Top half

Section 1

Section 2

Section 3

Section 4

Bottom half

Section 5

Section 6

Section 7

Section 8

Championship match statistics

External links
 2004 Australian Open – Women's draws and results at the International Tennis Federation

Women's singles
Australian Open (tennis) by year – Women's singles
2004 in Australian women's sport
2004 WTA Tour